The 2017 Women's Pan-American Volleyball Cup was the 16th edition of the annual women's volleyball tournament. It was held in two cities, Lima and Cañete, in Peru from 17 June to 25 June. Twelve teams competed in the tournament.

The United States won the title when they defeated the Dominican Republic 3–1 in the final. American Micha Hancock was awarded the Most Valuable Player.

Pools composition

Venues
Coliseo Eduardo Dibós, Lima
Coliseo Lolo Fernández, Cañete

Pool standing procedure
 Number of matches won
 Match points
 Points ratio
 Sets ratio
 Result of the last match between the tied teams

Match won 3–0: 5 match points for the winner, 0 match points for the loser
Match won 3–1: 4 match points for the winner, 1 match point for the loser
Match won 3–2: 3 match points for the winner, 2 match points for the loser

Preliminary round
All times are Peru Standard Time (UTC−05:00)

Group A

Venue: Coliseo Lolo Fernández, Cañete

Group B

Venue: Coliseo Eduardo Dibós, Lima

Final round

Championship bracket

5th–10th places bracket

11th place

7th–10th classification

Quarterfinals

9th place

5th–8th classification

Semifinals

7th place

5th place

3rd place

Final

Final standing

Individual awards

Most Valuable Player
  Micha Hancock
Best Setter
  Micha Hancock
Best Outside Hitters
  Regla Gracia
  Bethania de la Cruz
Best Middle Blockers
  Sinead Jack
  Natalia Aispurúa
Best Opposite
  Elizabeth McMahon
Best Scorer
  Heidy Casanova
Best Server
  Micha Hancock
Best Libero
  Mirian Patiño
Best Digger
  Brenda Castillo
Best Receiver
  Mirian Patiño

References

Women's Pan-American Volleyball Cup
Pan-American Volleyball Cup
International volleyball competitions hosted by Peru
Vol
Sports competitions in Lima
June 2017 sports events in South America